Balak-Palak (meaning Children-Parents) (BP) is a 2013 Marathi language comedy-drama film on the topic of sex education. The film is directed by Ravi Jadhav and produced by Riteish Deshmukh, Uttung Thakur and Ravi Jadhav. This is the first film produced by actor Riteish Deshmukh. The story was written by Ganesh Pandit and Amber Hadap. Balak Palak was shot by  Mahesh Limaye.

The initials formed by the title of the film (BP) also make a secondary reference to a 'blue picture' or low-quality pornographic videos that were available on videotape in the 1980s in South Asia. The film deals with the topic of sex education of adolescents  and is rated UA (Parental Guidance). With the positive reviews the film received, Deshmukh plans to make a Hindi language remake of the film. This film is being made into Tamil and Telugu  by Director Srikanth Velagaleti. Uttung Thakur will co-produce the remake with Mohan S. Devanga of Kangaroo Motion Pictures.the movie has been the inspiration for Malayalam movie Swarnamalsyangal directed by popular quizmaster G S Pradeep.

The film was released with English subtitles. Shivkumar Parthasarathy did the subtitling.

Cast

 Shashwati Pimplikar as Dolly Gavaskar
 Madan Deodhar as Bhagya/Bhagyesh Rege
 Bhagyashree Shankpal as Chiu/Aarti Puranik
 Rohit Phalke as Avya/Avinash Gandhe
 Prathamesh Parab as Vishu
 Kishor Kadam as Kadam Kaka
 Avinash Narkar as Vidyadhar Gandhe, Avinash's father
 Sai Tamhankar as Neha Sawant
 Vishakha Subhedar as Pednekar Kaku
 Supriya Pathare as Mrs. Puranik, Aarti's mother
 Anand ingale as Pandharinath Rege, Bhagyesh's father
 Anand Abhyankar as Ashok Gavaskar, Dolly's father
 Madhavi Juvekar as Mrs. Gavaskar, Dolly's mother
 Subodh Bhave as older Avya
 Amruta Subhash as older Dolly
 Satish Tare as Ramesh
 Dhanashree Parab as Sampada

Music
The songs of the film are composed by the duo Vishal–Shekhar. Known for their music compositions in Bollywood films, this is the first Marathi film venture of the duo.

The track "Harvali Pakhare" was remade in Hindi by the same team, with lyricist Manoj Muntashir filling in as a replacement for Guru Thakur, as the song "Kehkasha Tu Meri" in the 2016 film Akira.

Reception
The film was screened at the South Asian International Film Festival (SAIFF) in New York City in November 2012.

The newspaper Daily News and Analysis gave 3.5 stars out of 5 in their review and called it a "must watch for parents!" The newspaper Mint  appreciated Jadhav for the direction of the film and keeping it  on a UA-rated course despite the boldness of the subject".

Feature 
On 3 January 2013, Riteish Deshmukh announced they are planning Hindi remake of Balak Palak.

References

External links
 
 

Indian comedy-drama films
Indian children's films
Sex education
Films about the education system in India
Films directed by Ravi Jadhav
2013 comedy-drama films
2010s Marathi-language films
2013 films